The Top 100 Canadian Albums is a book by journalist Bob Mersereau, published in 2007 by Goose Lane Editions.

Mersereau surveyed 600 music journalists, retailers, musicians and disc jockeys of all ages, from all parts of Canada, who each submitted a list of 10 favourite Canadian albums released between 1957 and 2007.

Criticism
Mersereau acknowledged that the list would cause debate among music fans across the country. "The important part is to talk about Canadian music and enjoy it," he said. "I'd be shocked if there wasn't complaints and arguments and debates."

A review from the National Post by Mark Medley identifies regional and genre biases in the book. Saying, “While any list of "Top 100" anything is sure to ignite some controversy, there are definitely some glaring omissions,”  Medley lists 10 albums, four from British Columbia artists.  One of these was The New Pornographers’ Mass Romantic.  “To completely leave off Carl Newman, Neko Case et al. is plain wrong. I'm grouping in Stars' 2004 album Set Yourself on Fire in with this.” Medley also noted the omission of The Grapes of Wrath's album Now and Again. “This album cracked the top 50 in Chart Magazine'''s 1996 and 2000 top 50 Canadian albums polls.” As well, Medley noted the underrepresentation of hip hop artists, specifically Maestro Fresh Wes’ Symphony in Effect and Dream Warriors' And Now the Legacy Begins.

Juan Rodriguez in the Montreal Gazette identifies a bias against Quebec artists, particularly francophone.  He notes that only 8% of the artists on the list are from Quebec, a province with over 23% of the population of Canada, and that only 2% of the artists are francophone artists from Quebec, a group that comprises 80% of the population of Quebec and close to 19% of the population of Canada.  Rodriquez examined Mersereau's list of contributing experts and found that only 10% of them were from Quebec, and 5% were francophones from Quebec.  Rodriquez questioned the people excluded from Mersereau's list of experts:  “Alain Brunet of La Presse — and dean of local French-language music critics — was not asked for his opinions. Indeed, La Presse, Le Journal de Montréal and The Gazette were shut out. Major observers of "la scène locale" like Patrick Baillargeon and Olivier Robillard Laveaux of Voir'' aren't there.”  Rodriquez concludes that “Mersereau's inability to face all the music created in Canada in a cogent critical manner is disturbing.”

The List

See also

List of number-one singles (Canada)
List of diamond-certified albums in Canada

References

External links
 canada.com article
 canoe.com article
 CBC.ca article

2007 non-fiction books
Canadian non-fiction books
Books about Canada
Goose Lane Editions books